This is a list of members of the Senate of the United States of Indonesia. The legislature existed only for a brief period during the existence of the federal state, and had 32 members, two from each constituent state.

Speakers and Deputy Speakers

List

Bibliography

References 

Lists of political office-holders in Indonesia